This is the results breakdown of the local elections held in the Valencian Community on 28 May 1995. The following tables show detailed results in the autonomous community's most populous municipalities, sorted alphabetically.

Overall

City control
The following table lists party control in the most populous municipalities, including provincial capitals (shown in bold). Gains for a party are displayed with the cell's background shaded in that party's colour.

Municipalities

Alcoy
Population: 64,291

Alicante
Population: 274,964

Benidorm
Population: 46,493

Castellón de la Plana
Population: 139,094

Elche
Population: 191,305

Elda
Population: 55,563

Gandia
Population: 57,186

Orihuela
Population: 51,765

Paterna
Population: 45,944

Sagunto
Population: 57,630

Torrent
Population: 60,617

Torrevieja
Population: 29,955

Valencia

Population: 764,293

See also
1995 Valencian regional election

References

Valencian Community
1995